Matthew Thomas Tennyson (born April 23, 1990) is an American professional ice hockey defenseman currently under contract with the Coachella Valley Firebirds of the American Hockey League (AHL).

Early life
Tennyson is the son of Tom and Ann Tennyson, and was born on April 23, 1990 in Minneapolis. Tennyson graduated from Amador Valley High School in 2008.

Playing career
Undrafted, Tennyson attended Western Michigan University where he played three seasons of NCAA Division I college hockey with the Western Michigan Broncos men's ice hockey team. On March 30, 2012, Tennyson, a native of Pleasanton, California, signed a two-year entry-level contract with his hometown San Jose Sharks. He immediately turned professional to join the Worcester Sharks for the final games of their 2011–12 AHL season.

Tennyson was the first player from the San Jose Junior Sharks youth hockey program to play in the NHL, let alone with the Sharks.

On July 3, 2016, Tennyson signed as a free agent to a one-year, two-way contract with the Carolina Hurricanes. Beginning the 2016–17 season with AHL affiliate, the Charlotte Checkers, Tennyson was recalled after recording 7 points in 9 games to remain with the Hurricanes for the remainder of the season. He appeared in a career best 45 games, collecting 6 assists.

On July 1, 2017, Tennyson was on the move as a free agent, agreeing to a two-year contract with the final year on a one-way basis with the Buffalo Sabres. On November 30, the Sabres placed Tennyson on waivers after 14 scoreless games with the club. He went unclaimed and was reassigned to AHL affiliate, the Rochester Americans.

On July 1, 2019, Tennyson left the Sabres as a free agent to sign a two-year, two-way contract with the New Jersey Devils. In the opening stages of the 2019–20 season, on October 11, Tennyson was called up from the Binghamton Devils to the New Jersey Devils in place of Andy Greene who was put on the injured reserve list with an upper body injury.

On July 28, 2021, Tennyson signed as a free agent to a two-year, two-way contract with the Nashville Predators. Tennyson featured in 8 regular season games with the Predators through the  season, posting 3 assists. He played the majority of the season with AHL affiliate, the Milwaukee Admirals, adding a veteran presence to the blueline in 53 games.

On July 3, 2022, Tennyson was mutually released from the remaining year of his contract with the Predators after he was placed on unconditional waivers.

On September 1, 2022, it was announced that Tennyson signed for the Coachella Valley Firebirds inaugural season in Palm Desert, California, for the 2022–23.

Career statistics

Regular season and playoffs

International

Awards and honors

References

External links

1990 births
Living people
American men's ice hockey defensemen
Binghamton Devils players
Buffalo Sabres players
Carolina Hurricanes players
Cedar Rapids RoughRiders players
Charlotte Checkers (2010–) players
Coachella Valley Firebirds players
Milwaukee Admirals players
Ice hockey people from Minneapolis
Nashville Predators players
New Jersey Devils players
Ice hockey players from California
People from Pleasanton, California
Rochester Americans players
San Jose Barracuda players
San Jose Sharks players
Texas Tornado players
Undrafted National Hockey League players
Western Michigan Broncos men's ice hockey players
Worcester Sharks players